Winterset Municipal Airport  is a public use airport located two nautical miles (4 km) north of the central business district of Winterset, a city in Madison County, Iowa, United States. Formerly known as Winterset-Madison County Airport, it is owned by the Winterset Airport Authority. This airport is included in the National Plan of Integrated Airport Systems for 2011–2015, which categorized it as a general aviation facility.

Facilities and aircraft 
Winterset Municipal Airport covers an area of 33 acres (13 ha) at an elevation of 1,110 feet (338 m) above mean sea level. It has one runway designated 14/32 with an asphalt surface measuring 3,000 by 50 feet (914 x 15 m).

For the 12-month period ending September 8, 2011, the airport had 4,750 general aviation aircraft operations, an average of 13 per day. At that time there were 18 aircraft based at this airport: 89% single-engine and 11% multi-engine.

References

External links 
 Winterset Municipal (3Y3) at Iowa DOT Airport Directory
 Aerial image as of September 1995 from USGS The National Map
 

Airports in Iowa
Transportation buildings and structures in Madison County, Iowa